"Send Me an Angel" is a song by the German rock band Scorpions, recorded for their 11th studio album, Crazy World (1990). The song was composed by Rudolf Schenker, written by Klaus Meine, and produced by Keith Olsen and the band. It was released as the album's fourth and final single in September 1991. Along with "Wind of Change", the song became the album's signature track, reaching number 44 on Billboard Hot 100 Chart on 25 January 1992, number 8 on the Mainstream Rock Chart on 19 October 1991, and high chart positions in many European countries.

Other versions
An orchestral version of the song was recorded for the 2000 orchestral album Moment of Glory that features vocals split with Italian singer Zucchero. An acoustic version of the song was also recorded for the 2001 acoustic album Acoustica.

Influence
In 1994, heavy metal band Black Sabbath released the Cross Purposes studio album which contains the same burning angel in the design of the cover that the "Send Me an Angel" single has. Neither band has commented on the matter.

Track listings
7-inch single
 "Send Me an Angel" – 4:32
 "Crazy World" – 5:08

CD maxi
 "Send Me an Angel" – 4:32
 "Crazy World" – 5:08
 "Holiday (live)" – 3:15

Personnel
Scorpions
 Klaus Meine – vocals
 Rudolf Schenker – lead guitar
 Matthias Jabs – rhythm & acoustic guitar
 Francis Buchholz – bass 
 Herman Rarebell – drums

Additional musician
 Jim Vallance – keyboards

Charts

Weekly charts

Year-end charts

Release history

Covers and remixes
 The song was covered by the German pop organist Klaus Wunderlich on one of his last albums, Keys for Lovers.
 In 2007, electronica group Sleepthief featuring Canadian singer Kristy Thirsk on vocals for their EP The Chauffeur. The song was featured on an episode of Cold Case ("Who's Your Daddy?").
Swedish singer Sofia Kaarlson covered the song in 2010 featuring the pop group Augustfamiljen.
Australian sisters Gabrielle and Abigail Stahlschmidt covered the song in 2012.
French group Kaktus Project covered the song in 2013.
Twin sisters Camille and Kennerly, from the U.S., covered the song as an electric harp duet in 2013.
Puerto Rican singer Daddy Yankee used the instrumental in his song "Ora Por Mí" in 2014, with other lyrics.
Brazilian rock project Fleesh covered the song in 2017.
 The song was covered by the Italian singer Emma Marrone with Italian lyrics.
The song was covered by Russian Darkpsy artist Psykovsky with Tan Tan.

Use in popular media
 The song was used at the end of the fifth episode of the second season of the TV show Cold Case

References

External links
 Lyrics

1991 songs
1991 singles
Mercury Records singles
Phonogram Records singles
Scorpions (band) songs
Song recordings produced by Keith Olsen
Songs written by Klaus Meine
Songs written by Rudolf Schenker
Vertigo Records singles